Yedidia Vital (born 2 October 1984) is an Israeli actor. Known for portraying the protagonist of the Israeli television series Split and HaShminiya.

Biography
Yedidia Vital was born on 2 October 1984 at a hospital in Ramallah, to Jewish-Israeli parents. He grew up in Pardes Hanna-Karkur, Israel. However he moved to Tel Aviv to become an actor. At first he has lived off of temporary work to pay the rent. Then attended the Nissan Nativ Acting Studio in Tel Aviv, where he was trained as an actor. From 2009-2012 he played one of the main character in the Israeli television series Split. Since 2005 he plays the lead role in HaShminiya (Hebrew: השמיניה). Next to television series and films Yedidia has also appeared in several theatre plays. In 2012 he played a main role in the theatre play World Cup Wishes (Hebrew: משאלה אחת ימינה). In 2013 he took part in the one man play I never (Hebrew: אף פעם לא). In 2014 he could be seen in the theatre play Tribes (Hebrew: שבטים).

Filmography

Film

Television

External links

Yedidia Vital at Ishim (Israeli film data base)

References

1984 births
Israeli Jews
Israeli male television actors
Living people
21st-century Israeli male actors